Deemak is a 2014 Pakistani drama serial directed by Mohsin Mirza, produced by A&B Entertainment and written by Seema Munaf. The drama stars Sami Khan, Beenish Chauhan and Zhalay Sarhadi in lead roles, and first aired on 26 November 2014 on Geo Entertainment and continued to air weekly. The drama focuses on the issue of consanguineous marriages.

Cast
Sami Khan
Zhalay Sarhadi
Beenish Chohan
Faizan Khawaja
Kamran Jilani
Seemi Pasha
Yasir Mazhar
Gul-e-Rana
Farhan Ally Agha
Shahid Naqvi
Shehryar Zaidi
Adnan Jilani

References

Urdu-language television shows
Pakistani drama television series
2014 Pakistani television series debuts